São Luís do Quitunde is a municipality located in the western of the Brazilian state of Alagoas. Its population was 34,692 (2020) and its area is 404 km².

References

Municipalities in Alagoas